The Florida Scorpions (originally the "Florida Knights") were an indoor football team.  They were a 2008 expansion member of the American Professional Football League.  They played their home games at the Manatee Civic Center.  They played their first season in the National Indoor Football League as the Sarasota Knights.  The NIFL suspended operation on May 14, 2007, and have advised teams to attempt to re-establish themselves financially for an attempt at a 2008 season.  The Knights decided to move to the APFL, where they played in the newly formed South Division.  The APFL, and the Scorpions, would folded after the 2008 season.

Season-By-Season 

|-
| colspan="6" align="center" | Sarasota Knights (NIFL)
|-
|2007 || 0 || 2 || 0 || 5th Atlantic Florida || --
|-
| colspan="6" align="center" | Florida Knights/Scorpions (APFL)
|-
|2008 || 2 || 3 || 0 || 3rd Southern || --
|-
|2011 || 0 || 1 || 0 || 6th APFL || --

External links
Official Website
The National Indoor Football League
Article about team's move to Bradenton and APFL

American Professional Football League teams
American football teams in Florida
Sports in Bradenton, Florida
American football teams established in 2011
American football teams disestablished in 2011
2011 establishments in Florida
2011 disestablishments in Florida